Jan Woltjer may refer to:
 Jan Woltjer (classical scholar)
 Jan Woltjer (astronomer)